In geometry, the small ditrigonal dodecacronic hexecontahedron (or fat star) is a nonconvex isohedral polyhedron. It is the dual of the uniform small ditrigonal dodecicosidodecahedron. It is visually identical to the small dodecicosacron. Its faces are darts. A part of each dart lies inside the solid, hence is invisible in solid models.

Proportions 
Its dihedral angles equal .

References

External links
 

Dual uniform polyhedra